Festival of Chariots refers to the Ratha Yatra festivals run by the International Society for Krishna Consciousnesss (ISKCON). The main event is a chariot procession through the streets. The procession may then be followed by performing arts presentations on the stage and visiting various booths encamped at a park site. The festivals involve chants, the arts, music, and free vegetarian feasts that can be seen over the world but specifically in the United States (birthplace of ISKCON). ISKCON, commonly referred to as Hare Krishna is a branch of Hindu religiosity.  ISKCON have used the practice of Hindu festivals as an important element of Hare Krishna expression, and is a recognisable feature of their appearance in the public realm. Kirtan is an element that is common to all ISKCON festivals. Kirtan is a process of musical worship, that is accessible for group participation and as described by Edwin Bryant as “Krishna in vibratory form”. The practice of kirtan are melodies, mantras, spiritual texts that proclaim God's name in his many forms. The ‘Festival of India’ is the International society for Krishna consciousness conveying Indian expression in the global sphere.

History 
The International society for Krishna Consciousness was founded in New York in 1966 by A.C. Bhakitivendanta Swami Prabhupada. Prabhupada (birth name; Abhay Charan), was born in Calcutta, 1896, and received a European focused education, graduating university with majors in economics, English and philosophy.  He committed to a religious journey in 1944 whereby he stated that he has ‘…taken the courage to take up the work.’ In 1965 he migrated to the United States and commenced teachings of the Gita. During his life he completed over 70 volumes on Krishna tradition. ISKCON roots are of Hinduism and focuses on the Gita and Purana which feature Krishna. ISKCON emerged due to the myth of Krishna, Lord Krishna is the eighth avatar of Vishnu, the ‘preserver’. Krishna is the protagonist of Hindi texts, the Mahabharata and the Bhagavata Purana and the Bhagavad Gita. He acts as a counsel during civil wars and is a symbol of peace and a guide on how to achieve inner liberation and freedom. Additionally, he is known to of explored the importance of yoga to spiritual well-being. Krishna is a highly recognised God in the western world partly due to the Hare Krishna influence in the west. ISKCON follow Vaishnavism meaning the worship of Vishnu and believe Krishna to be the central of all of Vishnu's avatars. Vaishnavas believe that the ultimate reality is personal and there their souls are eternal beings whom have forgotten their connection to God. Strong emphasis is placed on chanting as it is believed that this can awaken to the soul to the spiritual realm.

Ratha Yatra

The festival of Chariots originated in India in a city called Jagannatha Puri. The festival has been used in Vishnu-related traditions in Hinduism along with other traditions such as Daoism. The festival celebrates Lord Krishna return to Vrindavan. Vrindavan is a town in the Mathura district of Uttar Pradesh, India however it is also a symbolic as an eternal spiritual place which encumbers everything and is transcendental. To go to Vrindavan is the act of seeing God himself, as you are enveloped by them.  Vrindavan is where Krishna returned, but Vrindavan is also Krishna himself. This tradition of using a chariot in public procession is an ancient tradition, common in many Asian traditions. The pulling of the chariot symbolises the pulling of the lord into one's heart.

World-wide example 
The festival of the chariots is now celebrated world-wide, in nearly every major city. For example, in San Francisco the festival is celebrated annually. The event causes a city-wide interruption as the festival draws in thousands of people to participate. In 2017 procession wooden carts were rolled through the streets accompanied by the ISKCON chant; “Hare krishna, hare krishna, krishna krishna, hare hare…”. Food and music are essential parts of the festival, as in many ISKCON festivals. Vegetarian food is usually supplied during the festival and well as information on how to become part of the community. The festivals display a connectivity of Indian culture and ethically non-Indian population. Vani Devi Das born in Sacramento, US was brought up within the movement and attends the annual festival. Das makes it a family affair bringing her children. She is an example of the festival of Indian functioning in a western sphere.

Controversy 
Notable points of controversy include:

 Cultural tension these festivals have caused outside India. In Singapore the state has been historically hostile towards members of ISKCON. The practice of festival, central to their beliefs, have had to been practiced in different ways such as in personal houses, farms or stadiums. ISKCON expression has taken a different mode when interacting with its culturally situated surroundings.
  Some believe that the festival has been stripped of its religious value spectators who participate for non-religious recreational purposes. This specifically relates to Holi ‘the festival of colours’.

References 

Hindu festivals in India
International Society for Krishna Consciousness